Business International is a news television programme which aired on CNN International. It was anchored by Adrian Finighan and Becky Anderson from CNN's London studios.

Business International was launched in 2000.  As the title implies, it covered international business news.  During the programme, market reports would come from the London Stock Exchange.  However, in later years, the programme devoted more air time to breaking world news.

The European evening edition of the programme, presented by Anderson, also had sports updates and a preview of the following day's newspaper headlines.

Show-times
Business International aired up to three live one-hour editions on weekdays.  The show aired at 8.00, 11.00 and 22.00 GMT on weekdays.

Cancellation
Business International was cancelled in 2009 and replaced by World Business Today and Quest Means Business.

British television news shows
Business-related television series
CNN original programming